Epistle to Dippy is a song and single by Donovan, released in 1967 outside the United Kingdom only.

Musicians featured are Donovan on vocals and acoustic guitar,  Jimmy Page on electric guitar, John Cameron on keyboards and arrangement, Danny Thompson on bass, and Tony Carr on drums.  Strings were provided by the Royal Philharmonic Orchestra.

Written in the form of an open letter to an old school friend, the song had a strong pacifist message in addition to its florid psychedelic imagery. The real "Dippy" was, at the time, serving in the British Army in Malaysia. According to Brian Hogg, who wrote the liner notes for the Donovan boxed set, Troubadour, Dippy heard the song, contacted Donovan and left the army as a result.

Billboard described the song as a "first rate performance of clever lyric material."  Cash Box said the single has an "infectious, near-Eastern flavor and a pulsing undertone."

Chart positions were: # 19 (USA Billboard), # 10 (USA Cashbox), # 10 (USA Record World), and #5 in Canada.

External links
 Epistle To Dippy (Single) - Donovan Unofficial Site

References 

Donovan songs
1967 singles
1967 songs
Baroque pop songs
Song recordings produced by Mickie Most
Songs written by Donovan